The 1952 All-Ireland Senior Hurling Championship Final was the 65th All-Ireland Final and the culmination of the 1952 All-Ireland Senior Hurling Championship, an inter-county hurling tournament for the top teams in Ireland. The match was held at Croke Park, Dublin, on 7 September 1952, between Cork and Dublin. The Leinster champions lost to their Munster opponents on a score line of 2-14 to 0-7.

Match details

All-Ireland Senior Hurling Championship Final
All-Ireland Senior Hurling Championship Final, 1952
All-Ireland Senior Hurling Championship Final
All-Ireland Senior Hurling Championship Finals
Cork county hurling team matches
Dublin GAA matches